Alien Love Secrets is an EP by guitarist Steve Vai, released on March 21, 1995, through Relativity Records. The EP reached No. 125 on the U.S. Billboard 200 and remained on that chart for two weeks, as well as reaching No. 72 on the Dutch albums chart.

Overview
Alien Love Secrets was written and recorded in less than six weeks as a stripped-down guitar, bass and drums record with minimal keyboards. According to Vai, he had wished to maintain a steady output of material following his 1993 album Sex & Religion, but the recording process for the 70+ minutes of his subsequent 1996 album Fire Garden was taking too long. The EP was therefore purposely released in anticipation of Fire Garden. Stylistically Alien Love Secrets marks a return to the more familiar instrumental rock of Vai's 1990 album Passion and Warfare, following the highly mixed reception to Sex & Religion.

Notable tracks include "Bad Horsie", which was derived from a riff played by Vai during the final scenes of the 1986 film Crossroads; "Juice" was featured on the soundtrack of the 1996 PlayStation video game Formula 1; "Ya-Yo Gakk" is a call and response interplay with vocal recordings of Vai's young son Julian; "Tender Surrender", one of Vai's most popular songs, bases itself around a familiar sound, structure and tempo as Jimi Hendrix's "Villanova Junction" from his 1969 performance at Woodstock, although written in a different key; and "The Boy from Seattle", which is a tribute to Hendrix written by Vai.

Critical reception

Stephen Thomas Erlewine at AllMusic gave Alien Love Secrets three stars out of five, calling it a "moodier, more atmospheric collection" than Passion and Warfare. He also praised his "fluid technique, which manages to never become completely mechanical."

Track listing

Personnel

Steve Vai – guitar, keyboard, Eventide H3000 harmonizer, drum programming, bass, engineering, production
Tommy Mars – organ (track 7)
Deen Castronovo – drums (tracks 3, 4, 6, 7)
Julian Vai – baby vocals (track 5)
Sergio Buss – engineering assistance
Bernie Grundman – mastering
Pam Daney – production assistance

Chart performance

References

External links
Guitar Nine Records - In Review: Steve Vai "Alien Love Secrets" at Guitar Nine Records

Steve Vai albums
1995 EPs
Relativity Records EPs